Shahbaz Khan (real name Haider Khan) is an Indian actor from Indore, Madhya Pradesh. He is famous for playing lead roles in television serials such as Chandrakanta, The Great Maratha, The Sword of Tipu Sultan, Betaal Pachisi, Yug, Maharaja Ranjit Singh, Bharat Ka Veer Putra – Maharana Pratap, Tenali Rama . He also appears in the 2018 Chinese film Dying to Survive.

Early life
Khan is originally from Indore, and is a son of Padma Bhushan winner Amir Khan, a doyen of Indian classical music. Khan studied in St Joseph Convent, Kamptee and Hislop College Nagpur, then had worked at Centre Point Hotel Nagpur for few years before moving to Mumbai.

Filmography

Films

 Naachnewale Gaanewale as main lead (1991)
 Meri Aan (1993), as Sher Khan
 Dhartiputra (1993) as Anwar Khan
 Kaise Kaise Rishte as main lead (1993) opposite Ayesha Jhulka
 Jai Vikraanta (1995), as DIG Sher Ali Khan (Second lead) 
 Share Bazaar (1997), as Raj 
 Darmiyan (1997), as Indar
 Amirzaada(1997), as main lead
 Ziddi (1997), as Lala Singh
 Qila, aka The Fort (1998), as Inspector Rana
 Major Saab (1998), as Vicky P. Bihari 
 Mehndi (1998), as Rajeshwar 
 Jai Hind (1999 film)  as Wali Shah
 International Khiladi (1999), as Police Commissioner 
 Hindustan Ki Kasam (1999 film) 
 Arjun Pandit (1999), as Sanjay
 Jwalamukhi (2000), as Sir David
 Badal (2000) as Asgar, Terrorist Ka Farz
 Chal Mere Bhai (2000), as Rakesh
 Raja Ko Rani Se Pyar Ho Gaya (2000) 
 Raju Chacha (2000), as Babu 
Officer,  (2001)as Awasti 
 Baghaawat Ek Jung as Police Inspector (2001)
 Jagira (2001) 
 Pyaar Zindagi Hai (2001), as Lt. Col. Jagat Khanna 
 Kyo Kii... Main Jhuth Nahin Bolta (2001), as Mr. Vinod Kalra 
 Aap Mujhe Achche Lagne Lage (2002), as Kania Pathan (special appearance)
 Hum Kisise Kum Nahin (2002) 
 Yeh Hai Jalwa (2002), as Chotu
 Jaani Dushman: Ek Anokhi Kahani (2002), as Raju 
 Karz: The Burden of Truth (2002)  as Police Inspector Khan 
 Taj Mahal - A Monument Of Love (2003)
 Khwahish (2003) as Doctor Medora
 Ek Hindustani (2003) 
 The Hero: Love Story of a Spy (2003), as Idris Malik
 Hawa (2003), as Dr. Asif Ali 
 Jaal: The Trap (2003), as Captain Amarjeet Indian Army
 Kismat (2004), as Raj Mallya's son 
 Woh (2004), as Police Inspector Sameer Yadav
 Masti (2004) 
 Dukaan: Pila House (2004), as Havaldar 
 Tango Charlie (2005) as Army Officer
 The Rising: Ballad of Mangal Pandey (2005), as Azimullah Khan
 Mr Prime Minister (2005) 
 Rafta Rafta: The Speed (2006), as Ponty Chaddha
 Ladies Tailor (2006), as Jeeva
 Ghutan (2007)
 Mr. Hot Mr. Kool (2007), as Lele
 Big Brother (2007), as Rajji Pandey 
 The Last Lear (2007) 
 The Game of Love (2009), as Gullu (uncredited) 
 Veer (2010), as Naunihaal
 Looteri Dulhan (2011)
 Agent Vinod (2012), as Colonel Huzefa Lokha
 Barbreek (2012) 
 JUST U & ME (2013)
 Singh Saab the Great (2013), as Jata Singh
 Bikkar Bai Sentimental as Police Inspector (2013) Punjabi Film
Mahabharat Aur Barbareek (2013), as Ghatotkacha
 Jatt James Bond (2014) as Police Inspector Punjabi Film
 Gajakesari (2014), Kannada film
 Keep Safe Distance (2016), Rama Dhanraj production
 Romeo & Radhika (2016), Gujarati film
Dhingana (2017) Marathi Film
Raktdhar (2017)
Dying to Survive (2018), Chinese film
Touch Chesi Chudu (2018) as Rauf Lala Telugu film
Turning Point (2018), by Pruthvi Film Industries
Badla Hindustani Ka (2018)
Hum(Short Film) (2018)
Risknamaa (2019), by Kirti Motion Pictures Aarun Nagar

Television shows
 Jai Hanuman - Sankat Mochan Naam Tiharo (2022)
 Nath – Zewar Ya Zanjeer (2022) as Mr. Mishra 
 Mauka-E-Vardaat (2021) as Senior Inspector Khan
 Yeh Rishta Kya Kehlata Hai (2021) as Narendranath Chauhan 
 Phir Laut Aayi Naagin (2019), as Tejeshwar Singh
 Naye Shaadi Ke Siyape (2019), as Mubarak Khan
 Ram Siya Ke Luv Kush (2019), as Janaka
 Dastaan-E-Mohabbat Salim Anarkali (2018–2019), as Akbar
 Tenali Rama (2018) as Babur
 Karmaphal Daata Shani (2017–2018), as Ravana
 Dil Aashna Hai (2016)
 Santoshi Maa (2015–2016), as Pratap Mishra
 Bharat Ka Veer Putra – Maharana Pratap (2013–2015), as Bairam Khan
 Ek Ghar Banaunga (2013–2014), as Mata Singh
 Dekha Ek Khwaab (2011–2012), as Maharaj Briraj
 Afsar Bitiya (2011–2012), as Tuntun Singh
 Aahat (2010), as Shaitaani Aaina
 Maharaja Ranjit Singh (2010) as Jassa Singh Ahluwalia
 Mitwa Phool Kamal Ke (2009), as Maamchand Chaudhary
 Grihasti (2008–2009), as Tauji
 Raavan (2008), as Ahiravan / Sahastrarjun
 Naaginn (2007–2009) as Bhairavnath
 Saat Phere: Saloni Ka Safar (2007) as Padam Singh
 C.I.D. (2006) / (2007) as Karan / Don
 Suno... Harr Dill Kuchh Kehtaa Hai (2006)
 Ssshhhh...Koi Hai (2002–2003), as Mayakaal
 Amrapali (2002)
 Draupadi (2001) as Karna
 Main Dilli Hoon (1998), as Prithviraj Chauhan
 Betaal Pachisi (1997), as Betaal
 Neeyat (1997–1998)
 Yug (1997), as Virendra Singh aka Veeru
 Chandni (1996)
 Prithviraj Raso (1996), as Prithviraj Chauhan
  Chandrakanta (1994–1996), as Kunwar Virendra Vikram
 The Great Maratha (1994), as Mahadji Shinde
 The Sword of Tipu Sultan'' (1989), as Hyder Ali

Plays
  Ayodhya ki Ramlila  (2020, 2021,2022) as Ravana

References

External links
 

Indian male film actors
Indian male television actors
1966 births
Living people
Male actors from Indore
Male actors in Hindi cinema
Male actors in Hindi television
20th-century Indian male actors
21st-century Indian male actors